Boogeyman II (known as Revenge of the Boogeyman in the United Kingdom) is a 1983 American horror film directed by Ulli Lommel and starring Suzanna Love, Ulli Lommel, and Shannah Hall. It is a sequel to the 1980 film The Boogeyman, and follows the character of Lacey, who travels to Los Angeles to consult a film producer about making a feature film based on the supernatural events she occurred revolving around a malevolent spirit trapped in a mirror; Lacey unwittingly brings a broken piece of glass from the mirror with her, resulting in dire consequences. Like its predecessor, the film was banned in the United Kingdom as a "video nasty" during the 1980s.

Premise 
After a recap of the first film, supposedly based on true events, film makers attempt to try to recreate what occurred. After a piece of broken glass appears from the first film, killings begin again.

Main cast
 Suzanna Love as Lacey 
 Shannah Hall as Bonnie
 Sholto von Douglas as Joseph 
 Ulli Lommel as Mickey
 Bob Rosenfarb as Bernie 
 Rhonda Aldrich as Cynthia
 John Carradine is listed in the opening credits but only appears in flashback footage.

References

External links 
 

1983 horror films
1983 films
American slasher films
American sequel films
Films directed by Ulli Lommel
Films set in Los Angeles
Video nasties
1980s slasher films
1980s English-language films
1980s American films